Riot is an historical novel based upon the Pressed Steel Car Strike of 1909 by William Trautmann, a founder of the United States Industrial Workers of the World (IWW).

References

1922 American novels
Novels set in Pittsburgh
Industrial Workers of the World in fiction
Books about labour
Novels set in the 1900s